"Kako to Genjitsu" is Bonnie Pink's fifteenth single and third from the album Let Go. The single was released under the East West Japan label on June 7, 2000.

Track listing

Reason (Season Dub)

Oricon Sales Chart

2000 singles
2000 songs
Bonnie Pink songs